The 11th National People's Congress met for a 5-year term, from 2008 to 2013. It held five annual two week plenary sessions during this period.  It succeeded the 10th National People's Congress. There were 2,987 deputies elected to the 11th Congress in 2008, with 2972 in office at the end of the term (2012).

The 1st session 

The first session of the 11th Congress sat from March 5 to March 18, 2008. It re-elected Hu Jintao as President and Wen Jiabao as Premier. Xi Jinping was elected Vice-President. The State Council, China's cabinet, went through major restructuring.

The 2nd session 

The second session of the 11th Congress sat from March 5 to March 13, 2009. This congress tackled issues such as the worsening global financial crisis, attempted to introduce a new social welfare system, as well as checks and balances on public officials.

The 3rd session 

The third session of the 11th Congress sat from March 5 to March 14, 2010.

The 4th session 

The fourth session of the 11th Congress sat from March 5 to March 14, 2011.

The 5th session 

The fifth and final session of the 11th Congress sat from March 5 to March 14, 2012.

Election results 

 All state leaders were elected from one name ballots.

|-
! style="background-color:#E9E9E9;text-align:left;vertical-align:top;" |Parties
!style="background-color:#E9E9E9"|Seats
|-
| style="text-align:left;" |
Chinese Communist Party
Revolutionary Committee of the Kuomintang
China Democratic League
China Democratic National Construction Association
China Association for Promoting Democracy
Chinese Peasants' and Workers' Democratic Party
Zhigongdang of China
Jiusan Society
Taiwan Democratic Self-Government League
Non-partisans
| style="vertical-align:top;" |2,987
|-
|style="text-align:left;background-color:#E9E9E9"|Total
|width="30" style="text-align:right;background-color:#E9E9E9"|2,987
|}

See also 
 List of members of the 11th National People's Congress

References

External links 
  Official website of the NPC

National People's Congresses